Mr. V (born Victor Font, 1974 on the Lower East Side, New York) is an American House Music DJ, producer, and vocalist. He is also the owner of Sole Channel Music and Muzik 4 Tomorrow.

Mr. V started DJing at the age of 14 on the Lower East Side, but it would not be for many years that he would sign with the Vega Records label, Masters At Work Records and assisting Louie Vega.

In 2001, he founded Sole Channel, a weekly party with Alix Alvarez in New York City, In 2003 the pair would start a record label called Sole Channel Music releasing several tracks with their own sound.
In 2013 the pair would part ways with the label and Alix Alvarez would pursue different endeavours while Mr. V would maintain the record label, in 2012 Mr. V would launch the first sister label to Sole Channel Music called Muzik 4 Tomorrow (M4T).

His most famous tracks have been "Jus Dance", "Da Bump", released in 2006, and "Put Your Drink Down", released in 2007, both included in the album Welcome Home and is best known for his breakout hit with Fedde Le Grand Entitled "Back N' Forth" amongst many other tracks and collaborations today.

Experiencing Mr. V's DJ sets, original productions or remixes is like taking a trip back in time to dance music's golden age. Before superstar DJs took over the spotlight, dance music was a cultural phenomenon that did what no other form of music could do – bring people together. It didn't matter what race or sexual orientation you came from because dance music was all about embracing our differences and creating a homogeneous vibe. The music was built heavily on traditional song structures and much heart and soul. DJs played whatever it took to get the party going and the music was never predictable. It is with this classic spirit and enthusiasm that New York City's Mr. V targets today's dance music world.

Mr. V is a throwback in the purest sense.
Growing up in the 1980s the open-minded, hardworking Mr. V was heavily influenced by House, Hip-Hop, Latin, Garage and Disco classics, Rhythm & Blues and Jazz. Mr. V was enamored by the role a DJ commanded over a crowd (from the amazing unity of music to the power of controlling music) and was taken by the talents of his friend Lord G., who had a weekly Thursday night party in New York City. Despite wanting to be a professional DJ, it wasn't until he met the legendary Louie Vega that he found his calling. “Louie used to have his party called “Underground Network,” and that's where I discovered a deeper taste for house music. I always wanted to be a DJ from the age of 14, but Louie's type of music – that whole soulful sound – is what I wanted to play,” says Mr. V.

Louie Vega saw the drive and potential in Mr. V and hired the young Nuyorican DJ / producer as his assistant at the world famous Masters At Work label. In this position Mr. V was given a rare glimpse into the global dance scene and before long was taking to the decks alongside his mentor. Currently, Mr. V is one of the most recognizable names on the circuit. Stylistically, Mr. V has a wildly eclectic sound that brings spontaneity back to the art of DJing. His catchy, rhythm and motion filled style being easy to find on the radio. However, his originality is irrefutable.

In addition to his busy DJ schedule – Mr. V has displayed his turntable talents at many popular nightclubs across the globe – he has also made a name for himself as a producer, remixer and artist. Mr. V launched his own label Sole Channel Music (along with then partner Alix Alvarez) as a way to release music with complete control and artistic freedom. To date, he has many singles, remixes & collaborations on many labels including his most famous track "Jus Dance", “Something (Wit’ Jazz)”, "Put Your Drink Down" and more.

Mr. V has also released original productions, collaborations and remixes for other labels including Vega Records, Flamingo Records, Play It Down, Dessous Recordings, King Street Sounds, Large Music, Strictly Rhythm, Airplane Records, Defected Records and many more. Combining his multifaceted skills as a DJ / Artist/ Producer / Remixer and with an ear towards dance music's roots, Mr. V is a name to watch out for!]

References

External links
 Sole Channel Music
 Mr. V on Discogs
 Mr. V on Myspace

1974 births
American house musicians
Living people
Rappers from Manhattan
People from the Lower East Side
21st-century American rappers